Atanas Pashev (born November 21, 1963) is a former Bulgarian football player who played as a winger.

Career
Born in Pazardzhik, Pashev played club football for most of his career with Trakia Plovdiv (now Botev Plovdiv), scoring 100 goals in 194 Bulgarian A PFG matches. He also once played with Kuala Lumpur FA in M-League in 1993. Pashev played in Beitar Jerusalem in the season of 1989-1990. He took part in 19 league games and scored 4 goals.

Pashev scored six goals in 36 appearances for the Bulgaria national football team and was a participant at the 1986 FIFA World Cup.

References

1963 births
Living people
Bulgarian footballers
Bulgaria international footballers
1986 FIFA World Cup players
First Professional Football League (Bulgaria) players
FC Hebar Pazardzhik players
Botev Plovdiv players
Beitar Jerusalem F.C. players
Hapoel Ramat Gan F.C. players
PFC Lokomotiv Plovdiv players
PFC Hebar Pazardzhik managers
Expatriate footballers in Malaysia
Expatriate footballers in Israel
Bulgarian expatriate footballers
Bulgarian expatriate sportspeople in Israel
Sportspeople from Pazardzhik
Bulgarian football managers
Association football midfielders
Bulgarian expatriate sportspeople in Malaysia